Blackout Effect (UK: 747) is a 1998 made-for-television disaster/thriller film. Blackout Effect was originally broadcast on NBC on January 4, 1998.

Plot
Eric Stoltz plays John Dantley, an NTSB officer sent to O'Hare Airport in Chicago to investigate a collision between Global Airlines Flight 1025 (a Boeing 757-200 from Los Angeles to Washington D.C.) and PDO Cargo flight 342 (a Boeing 727-200F flying westbound cargo plane), where 185 people are killed.

Charles Martin Smith plays Henry Drake, an air traffic controller who insists his radar system malfunctioned when the planes were being cleared for landing. When the rest of air traffic control dismiss Drake and blame the incident on human error, Dantley must discover the truth about the crash: Was Drake — a high-strung individual who already didn't get along with his co-workers — simply incompetent at his job or did Drake's co-workers and superiors know about and/or had previously been warned about the aging radar system showing signs of seriously malfunctioning and crashing at critical times (and thus liable to lead to deadly situations such as the one that happened), but instead of taking action ignored the warnings and initiated a cover-up?

Cast

Production notes and details
The film is credited in the UK as 747 and is released as such on DVD.

References

External links

Blackout Effect at Allmovie

1998 television films
1998 films
1990s disaster films
1990s thriller drama films
American aviation films
American disaster films
American thriller drama films
Disaster television films
Films about aviation accidents or incidents
NBC network original films
Films directed by Jeff Bleckner
American drama television films
Films scored by Gary Chang
1990s English-language films
1990s American films